Langøy is an island in the municipality of Kragerø in Telemark county, Norway. An area of 6,6 km² makes it the second largest island of Kragerø after Skåtøy. Its name, which means "Long island", reflects its shape only to some extent.

The island is populated, and there is a ferry, operated by Kragerø Fjordbåtselskap, connecting the island to the town of Kragerø. On the island is found several old mines, that used to provide iron to the ironworks of Fritzøe and Bærum. Mining of iron began on Langøy at some point in the 17th century, and continued until the midst of the 19th century. With the decline of ironworks in Norway in the 1860s, there was soon no market for iron, and the last of the mines at Langøy had to shut down in 1869.

The highest point on the island is Langøybratten, at 117 meters, followed by Fløyfjell at 103 meters.

References 

Kragerø
Islands of Vestfold og Telemark